Acmaeodera holsteni, or Holsten's flower buprestid, is a species of metallic wood-boring beetle in the family Buprestidae. It is found in North America.

References

 Bellamy, C.L. (2008-2009). A World Catalogue and Bibliography of the Jewel Beetles (Coleoptera: Buprestoidea), Volumes 1-5. Pensoft Series Faunistica No. 76-80.
 Nelson, Gayle H., George C. Walters Jr., R. Dennis Haines, and Charles L. Bellamy (2008). "A Catalog and Bibliography of the Buprestoidea of America North of Mexico". The Coleopterists' Society, Special Publication, no. 4, iv + 274.

Further reading

 Arnett, R. H. Jr., M. C. Thomas, P. E. Skelley and J. H. Frank. (eds.). (21 June 2002). American Beetles, Volume II: Polyphaga: Scarabaeoidea through Curculionoidea. CRC Press LLC, Boca Raton, Florida .
 Arnett, Ross H. (2000). American Insects: A Handbook of the Insects of America North of Mexico. CRC Press.
 Richard E. White. (1983). Peterson Field Guides: Beetles. Houghton Mifflin Company.

holsteni
Beetles described in 1939